Alo Karineel (also Aleksander-Oskar Karineel, or Aleksander-Oskar Kornel(l); 14 January 1892 Vastse-Antsla Parish (now Antsla Parish), Kreis Werro – 2 April 1942 Sukhobezvodnaya Station, Gorki Oblast) was an Estonian politician. He was a member of the III, IV and V Riigikogu, of the Estonian National Assembly and of the Riigivolikogu. He was a member of the Riigikogu since 18 November 1926. He replaced Heinrich Laretei.

References

1892 births
1942 deaths
People from Antsla Parish
People from Kreis Werro
Settlers' Party politicians
Patriotic League (Estonia) politicians
Members of the Riigikogu, 1926–1929
Members of the Riigikogu, 1929–1932
Members of the Riigikogu, 1932–1934
Members of the Estonian National Assembly
Members of the Riigivolikogu
Estonian military personnel of the Estonian War of Independence
Estonian people executed by the Soviet Union